Perry J. Kaufman is an American systematic trader, rocket scientist, index developer, and quantitative financial theorist. He is considered a leading expert in the development of fully algorithmic trading programs (mostly written in Fortran).

Career
Kaufman currently serves as the president of Kaufman Analytics, Ltd. He received a BS in Mathematics from the University of Wisconsin and an MBA from the New York Institute of Technology.

Aerospace background
Beginning as a “rocket scientist” in the aerospace industry, Kaufman worked on the navigation and control systems for the Orbiting Astronomical Observatory, the predecessor of the Hubble Space Telescope. Moreover, he was involved in the development of navigation systems for Project Gemini which were later used for Apollo missions.

Trading experience
Kaufman worked in trading, research and advisory functions at major commercial banks, securities houses, central banks, and hedge funds.

After leaving the aerospace industry, Kaufman became a partner in an Illinois-based farm management company where, as a commercial hedger, he developed expertise in trading commodity futures markets. Between 1981 and 1991, Kaufman resided in Bermuda where he worked as Head of Trading Systems for Transworld Oil, Ltd. (Bermuda). He was a principal at Man-Drapeau Research (Singapore) from 1992 to 1998 and worked in consulting functions for Cinergy and Prudential-Bache. Between 2003 and 2008, Perry J. Kaufman worked as a portfolio manager and senior quantitative analyst for Graham Capital Management, a hedge fund with a focus on managed futures trading strategies. Kaufman is currently a consultant to Mizuho Alternative Investments and serves as a board member at ARIAD Asset Management GmbH. Kaufman also advises the Aquantum Group and collaborates with the company in the design of systematic trading programs and indices.

Publications & Canon Contributions
Kaufman is the founder of the Journal of Futures Markets and creator of John Wiley & Sons's Traders Advantage series.

Kaufman has authored numerous books, the most popular of which is New Trading Systems and Methods, first published by John Wiley & Sons in 1978 and now in its fifth edition. Since the late 1970s, Kaufman has published a total of 14 books to contribute to theories in the areas of price forecasting and portfolio allocation. Some of his books were translated into Chinese, Russian, Italian, Spanish, and Japanese. His latest book, Learn to Trade, was published in 2022.

Since 1973, Kaufman has published numerous articles in, for example, the Journal of Futures Markets, Futures, Technical Analysis of Stocks and Commodities, and Futures Industry Magazine. Samples of this work can be found below.

Kaufman has been a speaker at universities, major industry seminars, New York Stock Exchange corporate training courses, and the Dow Jones World Tours. He has made a number of radio and television appearances. Examples of his presentations can be found below.

Books
 Point and Figure Commodity Trading Techniques (Investors Intelligence, Larchmont, New York, 1975)
 Commodity Trading Systems and Methods (John Wiley & Sons, 1978)
 Technical Analysis in Commodities (John Wiley & Sons, 1980), also in Japanese (UNI 1986)
 Handbook of Futures Markets (John Wiley & Sons, 1984)
 The Concise Handbook of Futures Markets (John Wiley & Sons, 1986)
 The New Commodity Trading Systems and Methods (John Wiley & Sons, 1987)
 Smarter Trading (McGraw-Hill, 1995)
 Global Equity Investing, with Alberto Vivanti (McGraw-Hill, 1997)
 A Short Course in Technical Trading (John Wiley & Sons, 2003), also in Chinese (Guangdong, 2006)
 Alpha Trading (John Wiley & Sons, 2011), also in Chinese (Guangdong, 2006)
 Trading Systems and Methods (John Wiley & Sons, sixth edition, 2019)
 Kaufman Constructs Trading Systems (2020)
 Learn to Trade: Trade To Win With A Rule-Based Method Paperback (2022)

Book contributions
 "Technical Analysis" in Nancy Rothstein's The Handbook of Financial Futures (McGraw-Hill, 1984)
 "Moving Averages and Trends" in Todd Lofton's Trading Tactics (Traders Press, 1991)
 "Essential Mathematics for Traders” in Ralph Acampora's Masters of Technical Analysis and Strategy (John Wiley & Sons, 2008)

Articles and interviews
 "Perry Kaufman on Market Analysis" in Technical Analysis of Stocks and Commodities (June 1995, and reprinted in the 1998 bonus issue)
 "Price Shocks: Reevaluating Risk/Return Expectations" in Futures Industry Magazine (July 1995)
 "Trading Lessons Learned the Hard Way" in Futures (August 2002)
 "Crossover Relative Value Trading" in Futures (December 2008)
 "An Interview with Perry Kaufman" in The Technical Analyst (United Kingdom, May 2009)
 "Interview of Perry Kaufman, author of the bible of the trading systems" in AutomatedTrading.eu (United Kingdom, January 2013) 
 "A Book Review & Interview with Perry Kaufman" in The Swiss Technical Analysis Journal (Switzerland, Summer 2013) 
 "Algorithmic Trading Strategies: an interview with Perry Kaufman (Switzerland, Summer 2016)

Interviews, lectures and speeches
 “Robust Trading Systems” (IFTA, Rome and Milan, November, 1998)
 “Trading Systems That Work” (Online Investors Expo, Las Vegas, November, 2000)
 “Portfolio Allocation Using Genetic Algorithms” (IFTA, Madrid, 2004)
 “Intermarket Mechanics” (IFTA, Lugano 2006)
 “Theory Versus Reality” (Technical Analyst Association, Toronto, 2008)
 “Model Performance and Risk Metrics” (Technical Analyst Conference, London, 2009)
 “Strategy Development” (Forum, Paris, September 2009)
 “The Impact of Global Investing on Asian Markets” (Asian Financial Forum, Hong Kong, January 2011)
 “Positioning the Greek Equities Market for International Investing” (Second World Congress of Nonlinear Analysts, July 1996, Athens, Greece)

Board memberships and affiliations
 Advisor, Aquantum Group
 Board member, Ariad GmbH
 Member and first chairman of the advisory board, Vermont Securities Institute
 Editorial Board, Journal of Futures Markets (John Wiley & Sons)
 Member, AIMR, Boston and Vermont Chapters
 Member, The Society of Nonlinear Analysts
 Member, Market Technicians Association
 Member Assotechnic (Association of Technical Analysts, Italy)
 Previous member, Director's Committee, Columbia University (Business School), Center for the Study of Futures Markets

References

External links
 
 
 Articles by Perry J. Kaufman at tradingmarkets.com
 Perry Kaufman at INO TV

Living people
American business writers
American money managers
American hedge fund managers
University of Wisconsin–Madison College of Letters and Science alumni
New York Institute of Technology alumni
1943 births